Storo (meaning 'Big island') is an uninhabited island in the Scoresby Sound fjord, Sermersooq Municipality, eastern Greenland.

Geography
Roughly triangular in shape, Storo lies to the SW of Renland and is separated by the Snesund from the NW shore of Milneland. The small Sorte Island lies off its southern point. The island lies between the Ofjord to the north and the Rode Fjord to the west; the mouths of the Hare Fjord and the Rype Fjord are off its northwestern end.
The island has an area of 192 km2 and a shoreline of 63.3 kilometres.

Currently, the Canadian public company Greenland Resources Inc  holds the mineral rights for Storø and is conducting advance exploration programs to evaluate the economic feasibility of building a gold mine.

See also
List of islands of Greenland

References

Uninhabited islands of Greenland
Scoresby Sound

it:Storø